William Harrison (5 November 1883 – 29 April 1949) was an Australian rules footballer who played with Essendon in the Victorian Football League (VFL).

Family
The son of William Harrison (1852-1936), and Bliss Harrison (1854-1942), née Upstone, William Harrison was born on 5 November 1883.

Death
He died at Prince Henry's Hospital, in St Kilda Road, Melbourne on 29 April 1949.

Notes

References
 Holmesby, Russell & Main, Jim (2014), The Encyclopedia of AFL Footballers: every AFL/VFL player since 1897 (10th ed.), Seaford, Victoria: BAS Publishing. 
 Maplestone, M., Flying Higher: History of the Essendon Football Club 1872–1996, Essendon Football Club, (Melbourne), 1996.

External links 

1883 births
1949 deaths
Australian rules footballers from Victoria (Australia)
Essendon Football Club players